Kolchug is a rural locality (a selo) in Cherdynsky District, Perm Krai, Russia. The population was 223 as of 2010. There are 7  streets.

Geography 
Kolchug is located 19 km west of Cherdyn (the district's administrative centre) by road. Kushmangort is the nearest rural locality.

References 

Rural localities in Cherdynsky District